Philip Monk (23 August 1907 – 17 October 1993) was a New Zealand cricketer. He played five first-class matches for Otago between 1928 and 1930.

See also
 List of Otago representative cricketers

References

External links
 

1907 births
1993 deaths
New Zealand cricketers
Otago cricketers
Cricketers from Auckland